Shashthrapathi Anil Mihiripenna (10 August 1933 – 10 June 2017) was a Sri Lankan classical musician, who played the Bansuri, Esraj and Indian bamboo flute.
He played in the North Indian tradition and was the first Sri Lankan to obtain degrees in both flute and esraj. Running his Sharadha Kala Niketanaya, he endeavoured to teach, develop and popularise Indian classical music in Sri Lanka for the last forty years.

Career 
He graduated from the Visva-Bharati University India, better known as Santiniketan. He was one of the most talented oriental musicians who played the Flute and the Esraj. He studied under the great Esraj Maestros Ashish Chandra Benerji, Flute from Pandit Gowr Goswamy and Vocals from Pandit Jamini Kantha Chakrawarthi. He was conferred with Master of Arts (Musicology) by the Open International University (U.S.A.) in May 2004.

He has widely traveled on concert tours in the United States of America, Hong Kong, Taiwan, Singapore and several times in India. He was highly regarded as the leading Flutist cum Esraj player in Sri Lanka who could charm anyone with a musical ear.

He has composed music for several ballets, documentary films and feature films. He was a super grade artist at the Sri Lanka Broadcasting and Rupavahini Corporations. They have acknowledged him as an International artist.

He was a visiting lecturer at the University of Kelaniya. He is the founder of Sharada Kala Nikethanaya, an institution that propagates and popularizes Oriental classical music in Sri Lanka. The board of directors and the publication board of the American Biography Institute appointed him as an honorary member of their research board of advisors in 1999.

He was conferred with honorary citizenship by governor of Nebraska State of U.S.A.

The haunting notes that emanated from his flute bore the ample testimony to his talents and experience in his chosen field. His compositions are played throughout the Island by his pupils.

1955 – Joined Vishva Bharathi University (Santiniketan) India Studied Flute, Esraj & Vocal.
1959 – Graduated from the University First appointment as a Music teacher in the Department of Education.
1960 – First appointment as a Music teacher in the Department of Education.
1969 – Appointed as a lecturer of music at Govt. College of music.
1972 – Appointed as a visiting lecturer at the University of Kelaniya.
1974 – Appointed as a lecturer at the Institute of Aesthetic studies.

Personal life 
Anil was married to Mrs. Soma Mihiripenna

Performance 
1960 Selected by an audition, as a super grade artist on Flute & Esraj
1961 Started public performances at Lionel Wendt auditorium which was titled as "ABHIRANGA"
1964 Initiated series of programmes for intellectual audience
1967 The first Oriental Hevisi Band was formed for Ananda College, Colombo
1972 Lecture demonstration was held at Ananda College, Colombo
1973 Formed first Hevisi band at St. Lawrence's Convent, Colombo
1974 Performed for the University students at Horana

Foreign Tours 
1997 : Invited by following four American Universities
University of Nebraska
University of Wesleyan
University of Creighton
University of Omaha Recorded several programmes to introduce Flute, Esraj, Sitar and Violin for Educational Television Council for Higher Education on oriental music

1978 : Invited to perform at Indira Kala University (M.P) India
1983 : Invited to perform at Indira Kala University (M.P) India
1987 : Taken part in 5th Aspect International Art Festival in Hong Kong & Taiwan
1996 : Performed at Benaris Hindu University
1999 : Performed at Delhi University
2000 : Visited Vishva Bharati University (Shanthinikethan) in the capacity of president Tagore society and performed Flute & Esraj
2001 : Performed at Bhatkhande Music University 75th Jayanthi Mahotsava Festival

Compositions 
1978 : Composition titled "Peacock Dance" was performed by Nebraska Symphony Orchestra ( U.S.A. )
1980 & 1997 : Same composition was played at Colombo Symphony Orchestra
1985 to 1987 : Composed and directed combined orchestra for Sri Lanka Broadcasting Corporation
1985 : Composed and directed opening and closing theme for STX, S.L.B.C

Ballet Music 
1960 : Ranketiputha
1962 : Chandalika
1970 : Sebaliya
1975 : Omarilatha
1976 : Bilipuja
1977 : Mother
1983 : Snake & Eagle for French Ballet Master
1983 : Selalihini Sandesaya
1994 : Apeksha The musical score was adjudged as the best music for the year

Documentary and Featured films 
1984 The Mahaweli feature film for American Embassy
1992 Paradise in tears for German Embassy
1995 Film Ninja Sri Lanka

Books 
 A collection of 'Gat' in the North Indian musical tradition
 Diffusion of Indian Music in Sri Lanka
 Instruments of the East and the West
 Vadya Sankalana (Sinhala)
 Elements of Hindustani Music

CDs 
Sangeeth Bhavana
Saratha Sankalana

Watch Live Shows 
 Bhatiyali folk song 
 Floating Flute Part 1 
 Floating Flute Part 2 
 Floating Flute Part 3 
 Esraj

References 

Sinhalese musicians
Bansuri players
Hindustani musicians